Sergei Vladimirovich Fedorchenko (born 18 September 1974) is a Kazakhstani former gymnast who competed in the 1996 Summer Olympics and in the 2000 Summer Olympics.

The "Fedorchenko" is a dismount from high bar with two laid out backflips and three twists.  It remains rare because of its difficulty.  He also has a move named after him on pommel horse that is also used on floor exercise.

References

1974 births
Living people
Sportspeople from Almaty
Kazakhstani male artistic gymnasts
Olympic gymnasts of Kazakhstan
Gymnasts at the 1996 Summer Olympics
Gymnasts at the 2000 Summer Olympics
Asian Games medalists in gymnastics
Gymnasts at the 1994 Asian Games
Gymnasts at the 1998 Asian Games
Asian Games silver medalists for Kazakhstan
Asian Games bronze medalists for Kazakhstan
Medalists at the 1994 Asian Games
Medalists at the World Artistic Gymnastics Championships
20th-century Kazakhstani people